Ironweed is a 1987 American drama film directed by Héctor Babenco. It is based on the Pulitzer Prize-winning novel of the same name by William Kennedy, who also wrote the screenplay. It stars Jack Nicholson and Meryl Streep, with Carroll Baker, Michael O'Keefe, Diane Venora, Fred Gwynne, Nathan Lane and Tom Waits in supporting roles. The story concerns the relationship of a homeless couple: Francis, an alcoholic, and Helen, a terminally ill woman during the years following the Great Depression. Major portions of the film were shot on location in Albany, New York, including Jay Street at Lark Street, Albany Rural Cemetery, and the Miss Albany Diner on North Broadway. Despite mixed reviews and being a box-office bomb, Ironweed received two nominations at the 60th Academy Awards, Best Actor (for Nicholson), and Best Actress (for Streep).

Synopsis
During the 1930s depression, Francis Phelan (Nicholson) wanders the city. Francis is a washed-up and retired baseball player who deserted his family back in the 1910s, when he accidentally dropped his infant son to the ground, causing the child's death. He is implied to have been drunk at the time, but Francis claims he was just tired and does not understand why no one will believe in his story. Since then, he has been a bum, roaming the streets and punishing himself by remembering men whom he knew who died while he was younger in different circumstances. Wandering into his hometown of Albany on Halloween in 1938, Phelan seeks out his lover and drinking companion, Helen Archer (Meryl Streep). The two meet up in a mission managed by Reverend Chester (James Gammon), and later in Oscar Reo's (Gwynne) gin mill. Over the next few days, Phelan takes a few minor jobs to support Helen, while haunted by visions of his past. Eventually, Francis comes back to his old family house and tries to make peace with his wife Annie Phelan (Carroll Baker), his son Billy (Michael O'Keefe), and his daughter Peg (Diane Venora). Meanwhile, a group of local vigilantes takes it upon themselves to drive the homeless out of Albany by violent means. During the course of the day, a series of events unfolds and changes Francis' life forever.

Cast

Reception

Critical response
The film received mixed reviews. On Rotten Tomatoes, the film has an approval rating of 58% based on reviews from 24 critics. At the time of its release, it garnered enthusiasm because of the presence of stars Jack Nicholson and Meryl Streep.

Roger Ebert wrote, "Nicholson and Streep play drunks in Ironweed, and actors are said to like to play drunks, because it gives them an excuse for overacting. But there is not much visible 'acting' in this movie; the actors are too good for that." Ebert gave the film three stars out of four.

Streep received raves from most critics; Janet Maslin of The New York Times wrote that "Meryl Streep, as ever, is uncanny. Miss Streep uses the role of Helen as an opportunity to deliver a stunning impersonation of a darty-eyed, fast-talking woman of the streets, an angry, obdurate woman with great memories and no future. There isn't much more to the film's Helen than this, and indeed the character may go no deeper, but she's a marvel all the same. Behind the runny, red-rimmed eyes, the nervous chatter and the haunted expression, Miss Streep is even more utterly changed than her costar, and she even sings well. The sequence in which Helen entertains the real and imagined patrons of a bar room with a rendition of 'He's Me Pal' is a standout."

Frederic and Mary Ann Brussat appreciated the film's spiritual message, writing, "Mixing realistic and surreal scenes, Argentinean director Héctor Babenco puts the accent on what he calls the spiritual dimensions of William Kennedy's Pulitzer Prize-winning novel... If you ride with the emotional undertow of Ironweed, there's no way you'll ever look at street people in quite the same way".

Awards and nominations

References

External links
 
 
 
 Film trailer at YouTube

1987 films
1987 drama films
American drama films
Films about alcoholism
Films about homelessness
Films based on American novels
Films directed by Héctor Babenco
Films scored by John Morris
Films set in 1938
Films set in Albany, New York
Films shot in New York (state)
Great Depression films
Taft Entertainment Pictures films
TriStar Pictures films
1980s English-language films
1980s American films